Trichosanthes tricuspidata is a climbing plant in the family Cucurbitaceae.

Subspecies 
The following subspecies are listed in the Catalogue of Life:
 T. t. asperifolia
 T. t. seramensis
 T. t. siberutensis
 T. t. javanica
 T. t. rotundata
 T. t. tricuspidata
 T. t. flavofila
 T. t. strigosa
 T. t. tomentosa

Gallery

References

External links
 
 

tricuspidata
Flora of tropical Asia